Women's water polo at the 2015 Summer Universiade was held in Yeomju Indoor Aquatics Center, Gwangju, Korea from 2–14 July 2015.

Results
All times are Korea Standard Time (UTC+09:00)

Preliminary round

Group A

Group B

Final round

Final eight

Quarterfinals

5th–10th semifinals

Semifinals

9th place match

7th place match

5th place match

3rd place match

Final

Final standing

References

External links
Official website

Women
Universiade